Shaaban Idd Chilunda (born 20 June 1998) is a Tanzanian professional footballer who plays for the Moroccan club Moghreb Tétouan as a striker.

Club career
Born in Tandahimba, Chilunda joined Azam FC's youth setup in 2012. He made his first-team debut in 2016, and on 9 July 2018, he scored four times in a 4–2 home win against Rayon Sports FC for the year's Kagame Interclub Cup; he also scored the opener in a 2–1 final win against Simba SC.

On 7 August 2018, Chilunda agreed to a two-year loan deal with Spanish Segunda División side CD Tenerife, after a trial period. He made his professional debut thirteen days later, coming on as a late substitute for Filip Malbašić in a 1–1 away draw against Gimnàstic de Tarragona.

References

External links

1998 births
Living people
People from Mtwara Region
Tanzanian footballers
Association football forwards
Azam F.C. players
Segunda División players
Segunda División B players
CD Tenerife players
CD Izarra footballers
Tanzanian expatriate footballers
Expatriate footballers in Spain
Tanzania international footballers